The Order of Saint Agatha is a State order established on 5 June 1923 by the Grand and General Council of the Republic of San Marino.  It is named after Saint Agatha, on whose feast day 5 February, Pope Clement XII reestablished the sovereignty of the republic in 1740. 

The order is presented to foreign nationals who have positively contributed charitable and other services for the benefit of the republic deserving of recognition.

The award is conferred by the Grand and General Council on the proposal of the Most Excellent Regency of the Republic of San Marino. It has 5 ranks: Grand Cross, Grand Officer, Commander, Officer and Knight.

The badge of the order is a golden cross enamelled in white.  It is charged on one side with a round golden shield bearing the effigy of Saint Agatha and includes the inscription Sant'Agata Prottetrice (Saint Agatha Protector).  On the other side is written the epigraph Bene Merenti (to a well-deserving person).  The cross is hung on a ribbon with five stripes of white, crimson and yellow.

The Order of San Marino is the next higher in order of precedence.

Grades
The order is presented in five ranks:
Knight of Grand Cross (Cavaliere Gran Croce)
Knight Grand Officer (Cavaliere Grande Ufficiale)
Knight Major Officer or Commander (Cavaliere Ufficiale Maggiore o Commendatore)
Knight Officer (Cavaliere Ufficiale)
Knight (Cavaliere)

Recipients

Prominent people who have been awarded the Order of Saint Agatha

Design 

The Orders design is made up of a white-enamelled cross backed by a green-enamelled wreath of oak and laurel leaves. The central disc bears a painted image of Saint Agatha, the Orders namesake, surrounded by a white-enamelled ring. The ring bears the words; "SANT AGATA PROTETTRICE" (Saint Agatha Protector), while the bottom has a gold laurel wreath. The reverse of the badge shows a gold representation of the Coat of Arms of San Marino, surrounded by the Orders motto: Bene Merenti. 

The ribbon of the Order is actually the colours of the flag of San Marino, used between 1465 and 1797. The ribbon is made up of the three colours, with a larger field of burgundy in the center, edged with smaller bands of white and orange on both sides.

References

External links
Honours - website of the Ministry of Foreign Affairs, International Economic Cooperation and Telecommunications (of San Marino)
Laws establishing and amending the statutes of the Order of Saint Agatha 
Repubblica di San Marino 

Orders, decorations, and medals of San Marino